Storero Fabbrica Automobili was a car producer from Turin Italy. It was founded by ex. Fiat racing driver and motoring pioneer of Italy, Luigi Storero in 1912. The company built
four- and six-cylinder models until 1919.

References 

Defunct motor vehicle manufacturers of Italy
Vehicle manufacturing companies established in 1912
Italian companies established in 1912
Turin motor companies
Vehicle manufacturing companies disestablished in 1919
1919 disestablishments in Italy